Wannian Temple is a Buddhist temple located at the foot of Camel Mountain Range of Mount Emei, in Emeishan City, Sichuan, China. It is one of the six earliest Buddhist temples on Mount Emei. The temple is situated at the foot of Camel Mountain Range, facing the Daping Temple, Niuxin Temple, Shisun Summit and Bomeng Summit in the front. Wannian Temple is known not only for the bronze statue of Samantabhadra, but also for the Beamless Brick Hall.

History

East Jin and Tang dynasties
Wannian Temple was first established by Huichi in the East Jin dynasty (266–420), it was called "Puxian Temple" originally and changed to "Baishui Temple" when it was reconstructed by Huitong in 876 in the 3rd year of Qianfu period of the Tang dynasty (618–907). In the Kaiyuan period (713–741) of Emperor Xuanzong, poet Li Bai stayed in the Pilu Hall and wrote many poems while listening to the music played by Guangjun.

Northern Song dynasty
In 980, in the reign of Emperor Taizong in the Northern Song dynasty (960–1127), Maozhen restored the temple and cast a bronze statue of Samantabhadra in the temple. The temple was renamed "Baishui Puxian Temple".

Ming dynasty
In 1535, in the Jiajing era of the Ming dynasty (1368–1644), Biechuan made three statues of Buddha in the temple. Destroyed by a large fire in the Wanli period (1573–1620), it was rebuilt by monks under the order of Wanli Emperor in 1601. And the Beamless Brick Hall was added to the temple with a plaque inscribed by Wanli Emperor with Chinese characters of "Shengshou Wannian Temple".

Qing dynasty
In the fall when Mount Emei enjoys the best weather, the mount is decorated with colorful maple and ginkgo trees reflected on the green water lake. This poetic scenery was called "White Water in the Wind of Fall" and acclaimed one of the ten best sceneries in Mount Emei by Qing dynasty scholar Tan Zhongyue.

Republic of China
In 1946, the temple was completely destroyed with only the Beamless Brick Hall remaining.

People's Republic of China
After the founding of the PRC, the local government rebuilt the temple.

In the 1950s and 1960s, Zhu De, Chen Yi and He Long visited the temple successively. On July 8, 1980, Deng Xiaoping visited the temple and lived one night. In 1983, Wannian Temple was designated as a National Key Buddhist Temple in Han Chinese Area by the State Council of China. In 1986, the Shanmen, Hall of Maitreya, Hall of Pilu and Bore Hall were added to the temple. And the Drum Tower, Bell Tower and corridors were erected in 1991.

Architecture

Wannian Temple faces the west with the Shanmen, Hall of Maitreya, Beamless Brick Hall, Majestic Hall, Mahavira Hall, and the Buddhist Texts Library along the central axis of the complex.

Beamless Brick Hall
The Beamless Brick Hall was built in 1600 by Wanli Emperor to congratulate the birthday of his mother. Inspired by techniques and styles of India and Myanmar with not a single piece of wood was used. Walls of the hall are decorated with patterns of wood-like structures like circular arches, vertical columns, window lattices, etc. On the dome there are five white pagodas and statues of four auspicious animals. With the ancient style, the walls of dome were carved with small statues of Buddha, which were called "Thousand Buddha Worshiping Samantabhadra".

A bronze statue of Samantabhadra riding a white elephant is placed under the dome. The statue was cast in 980, during the 5th year of Taiping Xingguo period of the Northern Song dynasty (960–1127). Sitting on the lotus throne, Samantabhadra wears a golden crown on the head and holds a Ruyi, his mount is also standing on four lotus platforms.

Xingyuan Hall
Behind the Beanless Brick Hall is the Xingyuan Hall housing three national treasures: the Wanli Golden Seal, tooth relic of the Buddha and palm leaf manuscript.  The Wanli Golden Seal was cast in 1600 and presented by Empress Cixiaoxian. According to the Annals of Mount Emei, the palm leaf manuscript was presented by the King of Myanmar in the mid-16th century, namely the Jiajing period (1522–1566) of the Ming dynasty (1368–1644).

References

Bibliography
 
 

Buddhist temples in Sichuan
Buildings and structures in Leshan
Tourist attractions in Leshan
1954 establishments in China
20th-century Buddhist temples
Religious buildings and structures completed in 1954